Tyler Burke Johnson (born August 21, 1995) is an American professional baseball pitcher who is a free agent.

Career
Johnson attended Trinity Episcopal School in Richmond, Virginia and played college baseball at the University of South Carolina. He was drafted by the Chicago White Sox in the fifth round of the 2017 Major League Baseball (MLB) draft.

Johnson spent his first professional season with the Great Falls Voyagers (where he earned Pioneer League All-Star honors) and Kannapolis Intimidators, pitching to a 1–1 record and a 3.86 ERA with 37 strikeouts in  innings in 22 relief appearances between both teams.

In 2018, he pitched with Kannapolis, with whom he was named a South Atlantic League All-Star, and the Winston-Salem Dash, going 9–0 with 14 saves and a 1.40 ERA and a 0.88 WHIP over 58 relief innings in which he struck out 89 batters with both clubs.

In 2019, he began the season with the Birmingham Barons, pitching to a 3.44 ERA and going 2–0 over 12 relief appearances in which he struck out 23 batters in  innings. He missed time during the season due to injury. After the season, he was selected to the United States national baseball team for the 2019 WBSC Premier 12, but he did not pitch in the tournament.

On November 20, 2020, Johnson was added to the 40-man roster. On July 29, 2021, Johnson was released by the White Sox. On October 4, 2021, Johnson re-signed with the White Sox on a minor league contract. He elected free agency on November 10, 2022.

References

External links

1995 births
Living people
Arizona League White Sox players
Baseball pitchers
Baseball players from Virginia
Birmingham Barons players
Glendale Desert Dogs players
Great Falls Voyagers players
Kannapolis Intimidators players
People from Midlothian, Virginia
South Carolina Gamecocks baseball players
United States national baseball team players
Winston-Salem Dash players